The Granatkin Memorial is a youth association football tournament which traditionally features invited national teams composed of U-17/U-18/U-19 players. The tournament is held in Saint Petersburg since 2006 (previously in Moscow and Leningrad / Saint Petersburg), and since 2017 the final is held in summer (previously indoors in winter).

Tournament history
In 1981 in Moscow started the first Granatkin Memorial – the International youth football tournament initiated by the FIFA President Joao Havelange to perpetuate the memory of the FIFA First Vice-President Valentin Granatkin.

The tournament attracted the attention of both professionals and football fans. The matches of the Memorial were attended by the President of the International Olympic Committee Juan Antonio Samaranch. The prize to the winners was presented by Granatkin’s daughter Marina Valentinovna.

In 1981 and 1982 the tournament was held in Moscow. Since 1983 Leningrad became the Memorial residence. Till 1992 in twelve tournaments have taken part combined teams from 16 countries.

The second period of the Memorial started in the year 2001. Since that time the scheme of the competition radically changed. The number of the participants increased to 8 combined teams, which are divided into two groups. Every group plays round robin. When in play-off teams contest the places from 1 to 8.

Granatkin tournament is noted as a place of discoveries. Memorial is a first loud word from the future stars of world football – Andreas Moeller, Tony Meola, Oliver Bierhoff, Carsten Jancker, Marcel Desailly, Igor Kolyvanov, Anatoliy Tymoshchuk and Alexandr Mostovoi — many used to participate in the tournament.

Results

Statistics

Performances by countries
In total, eight countries celebrated the victory in the tournament.  Young players from 22 countries finished in top 3.  The most titled is team USSR / Russia with 20 wins.  Young talents from Germany won gold medals four times.  The third in the list of successful teams is Belarus (1 gold, 1 silver and 3 bronze medals).  In terms of the number of medals, the leaders are: USSR / Russia (38 medals), China and Ukraine (7 medals each).

Performances by confederations

See also
Toulon Tournament, a similar youth football competition held in France.

References

External links

Мемориал Гранаткина. 

 
Recurring sporting events established in 1981
International association football competitions hosted by Russia
International association football competitions hosted by the Soviet Union
Youth association football competitions for international teams
1981 establishments in the Soviet Union